Bahadur Shah I (14 October 1643 – 27 February 1712), also known as Mirza Muhammad Mu'azzam (Persian: میرزا محمد معظم) and Shah Alam I was the eighth Mughal Emperor who ruled from 1707 until his death in 1712. He was the second son of Mughal emperor Aurangzeb, who he conspired to overthrow in his youth. He was governor of Agra, Kabul and Lahore.

After Aurangzeb's death, his eldest son by his chief consort, Muhammad Azam Shah, declared himself successor, but was shortly defeated in one of the largest battles of India, the Battle of Jajau and overthrown by Bahadur Shah. During the reign of Bahadur Shah, the Rajput states of Jodhpur and Amber were annexed again after they declared independence a few years previously. Shah also sparked an Islamic controversy in the khutba by inserting the declaration of Ali as wali. His reign was disturbed by several rebellions, the Sikhs under the leadership of Banda Singh Bahadur, Rajputs under Durgadas Rathore and fellow Mughal Kam Bakhsh but all of them except for the rebellion by Banda Singh Bahadur (where he was killed) were successfully quelled. Bahadur Shah was buried in the Moti Masjid at Mehrauli in Delhi.

Early life

Bahadur Shah was born as Mu'azzam on 14 October 1643 in Burhanpur. He was the second son of prince Aurangzeb (later Mughal emperor) by his wife Nawab Bai.

During the reign of Shah Jahan
During his grandfather's reign, Mu'azzam was appointed vizer of Lahore from 1653 to 1659. Mu'azzam replaced Shaista Khan as the governor of Deccan in 1663. Shivaji raided the outskirts of Mughal Deccan's capital Aurangabad while the indolent Mu'azzam did little to prevent it. Enraged at this, Aurangzeb sent his most able commander Raja Jai Singh to defeat Shivaji and here the historic Treaty of Purandar was signed

During the reign of Aurangzeb

After Raja Jai Singh I defeated Shivaji at Purandar, Mu'azzam was given charge of the Deccan in May 1667 and was assisted by Maharaja Jaswant Singh.

In 1670, Mu'azzam organised an insurgency to overthrow Aurangzeb and proclaim himself the Mughal emperor. This plan may have been hatched at the instigation of the Marathas, and Mu'azzam's own inclinations and sincerity are difficult to gauge. Aurangzeb learned of the plot and sent Mu'azzam's mother, Begum Nawab Bai, to dissuade him from rebellion. Mu'azzam returned to the Mughal court, where he spent the next several years under Aurangzeb's supervision. However, Mu'azzam again nearly revolted in 1680 over Aurangzeb's scorched earth policy during his suppression of Rajput rebellions. Once again, Aurangzeb dissuaded Mu'azzam with gentleness and watched him with greater vigilance.

For the next seven years, from 1681 to 1687, historian Munis Faruqui describes Mu'azzam as a "grudgingly obedient son".

Treason
In 1681, he was sent by Aurangzeb to the Deccan to cut off the retreat of his step-brother Sultan Muhammad Akbar, who was in revolt. According to Faruqui, Mu'azzam deliberately failed in his mission. In 1683, he was ordered by Aurangzeb to march to the Konkan region to prevent the still rebellious Akbar from fleeing the country, but again Mu'azzam failed to achieve the assigned goal. Nevertheless, the emperor still persisted in entrusting his son with responsibilities, and in 1687, Aurangzeb ordered Mu'azzam to march against the sultanate of Golconda. Within weeks, the emperor's spies intercepted treasonous messages exchanged between Mu'azzam and Abul Hasan, the ruler of Golconda. This was something which could not be mistaken for incompetence; it was clearly treason. Aurangzeb imprisoned Mu'azzam and his sons, executed his closest followers, ordered his harem "shipped off to faraway Delhi", and dispersed his staff. Aurangzeb forbade Mu'azzam to cut his nails or hair for six months, gave orders depriving him of "good food, or cold water." He was not to meet anybody without his father's prior consent.

Around 1694, Aurangzeb rehabilitated Mu'azzam and allowed him "to rebuild his household", rehiring some of his officials. Aurangzeb continued to spy on his son, appointing his men to Mu'azzam's household, sending informants to his harem and choosing his representatives at the imperial court. Mu'azzam and his sons were transferred from the Deccan to north India, and were forbidden to lead military expeditions in the Deccan for the rest of Aurangzeb's reign. In 1695, Aurangzeb sent Mu'azzam to the Punjab region to fight the chieftains and subdue a rebellion by the Sikh Guru Gobind Singh. Although the commander imposed "heavy taxation" on the rajas, he thought it necessary to leave the Sikhs undisturbed in their fortified city of Anandpur and refused to wage war against them out of "genuine respect" for their religion. That year Mu'azzam was appointed governor of Akbarabad, and in 1696 he was transferred to Lahore. After the death of Amin Khan (governor of Kabul) he assumed that position in 1699, holding it until his father's death in 1707.

Emperorship

War of succession 
Without appointing a crown prince, Aurangzeb died in 1707 when Mu'azzam was governor of Kabul and his younger half-brothers (Muhammad Kam Bakhsh and Muhammad Azam Shah) were the governors of the Deccan and Gujarat respectively. All three sons intended to win the crown, and Kam Bakhsh began minting coins in his name. Azam prepared to march to Agra and declare himself successor, but was defeated by Mu'azzam at the Battle of Jajau in June 1707. Azam and his son, Ali Tabar, were killed in the battle. Mu'azzam ascended the Mughal throne at age 63 on 19 June 1707, with the title of Bahadur Shah I.

Annexations

Amber 

After ascending the throne, Shah made plans to annex Rajput kingdoms who declared independence after Aurangzeb's death. On 10 November Shah began his march to Amber (in Rajputana, present day Rajasthan state of India), visiting the tomb of Salim Chishti in Fatehpur Sikri on 21 November. In the meantime, Shah's aid Mihrab Khan was ordered to take possession of Jodhpur. Shah reached Amber on 20 January 1708. Though the monarch of the kingdom was Jai Singh, his brother Bijai Singh resented his rule. Shah ruled that because of the dispute, the region would become part of the Mughal empire and the city was renamed as Islamabad. Jai Singh's goods and properties were confiscated on the pretext that he supported Shah's brother Azam Shah during the war of Shah's succession and Bijai Singh was made the governor of Amber on 30 April 1708. Shah gave him the title of Mirza Rajah, and he received gifts valued at 100,000 rupees. Amber passed into Mughal hands without a war.

Jodhpur 
Jaswant Singh was the leader of the Rathore in Jodhpur (in Rajputana, in present-day Indian state Rajasthan) during Aurangzeb's reign. During a war of succession Singh sided with Aurangzeb's older brother Dara Shikoh, who was killed by Aurangzeb. Singh was pardoned, became titular ruler of the region and was appointed governor of the province of Kabul before his death on 18 December 1678. After his death, Aurangzeb ordered Singh's widows and his son Ajit Singh to be brought to Delhi and with plans of forcefully absorbing Ajit Singh in the Mughal army in the future. Though Durgadas Rathore of the Rathore clan who was ambitious of conquering Jodhpur from the Mughals, took advantage of this opportunity and fought a war to prevent Aurangzeb getting hold of Ajit, he tore through Delhi with his men and successfully escorted the Prince and the widows of Jaswant Singh to Jodhpur. After Aurangzeb's death, during Shah's half brother Muhammad Azam Shah's rule Ajit marched to Jodhpur and took it from Mughal rule.

In Amber he announced his intention to march to Jodhpur when Mihrab Khan defeated Ajit Singh at Mairtha, and he reached the town on 21 February 1708. His men were sent to bring Singh to the city for an interview with him, where Singh received "special robes of honour" and a jewelled scarf. Then, he headed towards Ajmer (in Rajputana, in present-day Indian state Rajasthan) and reached the city on 24 March, where he visited the Dargah Sharif.

Udaipur 
The state of Udaipur (in Rajputana, present day Indian state of Rajasthan) had submitted to the Mughal rule during the reign of Maharana Amar Singh I who was a contemporary of Mughal Emperor Jahangir. However the Sisodias declared independence after the death of Aurangzeb in 1707. Shah also had intention of recapturing Udaipur.

In Jodhpur, Bahadur Shah got the news that the Maharana Amar Singh II had fled from Udaipur to hide in the hills. His messengers gave him the message that Amar Singh got "afraid" by the happenings in Amber and Jodhpur and thought that his kingdom would also be annexed by the Mughals once again. According to the Bahadur Shah Nama chronicle, because of this incident the emperor called Amar Singh an "unbeliever". Bahadur Shah waged war against the king until his brother Muhammad Kam Bakhsh's insurgency diverted him southward.

Rajput Rebellion
While the emperor was on his way to Deccan to punish Muhammad Kam Bakhsh the three Rajput Raja's of Amber, Udaipur and Jodhpur made a joint resistance to the Mughals. The Rajputs first expelled the commandants of Jodhpur and Hindaun-Bayana and recovered Amber by a night attack. They next killed Sayyid Hussain Khan Barha, the commandant of Mewat and many other officers (September, 1708). The emperor, then in the Deccan had to patch up a truce by restoring Ajit Singh and Jai Singh to the Mughal Service.

Kam Bakhsh's uprising

Court rivalry 

His half-brother, Muhammad Kam Bakhsh, marched to Bijapur in March 1707 with his soldiers. When the news of Aurangzeb's death spread through the city, the city's monarch, King Sayyid Niyaz Khan surrendered the fort to him without a fight. Ascending the throne, Kam Bakhsh made Ahsan Khan, who served in the army as the bakshi (general of the armed forces), and made his advisor Taqarrub Khan as chief minister and gave himself the title of Padshah Kam Bakhsh-i-Dinpanah (Emperor Kam Bakhsh, Protector of Faith). He then conquered Kulbarga and Wakinkhera.

Rivalry developed between Taqarrub Khan and Ahsan Khan. Ahsan Khan had developed a marketplace in Bijapur where, without permission from Kam Bakhsh, he did not tax the shops. Taqarrub Khan reported it to Kam Bakhsh, who ordered the practise stopped. In May 1707, Kam Bakhsh sent Ahsan Khan to conquer the states of Golkonda and Hyderabad. Although the king of Golconda refused to surrender, Subahdar of Hyderabad Rustam Dil Khan did so.

Taqarrub Khan made a conspiracy to eliminate Ahsan Khan, alleging that meetings of Ahsan Khan, Saif Khan (Kam Bakhsh's archery teacher), Arsan Khan, Ahmad Khan, Nasir Khan and Rustam Dil Khan (all of them Kam Bakhsh's former teachers and members of the then court) to discuss public business were a conspiracy to assassinate Kam Bakhsh "while on his way to the Friday prayer at the great mosque". After informing Kam Bakhsh of the matter, he invited Rustam Dil Khan for dinner; arrested en route, Rustam Dil Khan was killed by being crushed under the feet of an elephant. Saif Khan's hands were amputated, and Arshad Khan's tongue was cut off. Ahsan Khan ignored warnings by close friends that Kam Bakhsh would arrest him, but he was imprisoned and his property seized. In April 1708, Shah's envoy Maktabar Khan came to Kam Bakhsh's court. When Taqarrub Khan told Kam Bakhsh that Maktabar Khan intended to dethrone him, Kam Bakhsh invited the envoy and his entourage to a feast and executed them.

March to South India 
In May 1708, the emperor wrote a letter to Kam Bakhsh which he hoped would "be a warning" against proclaiming himself an independent sovereign and began a journey to the Tomb of Aurangzeb to pay his respects to his father. Kam Bakhsh thanked him in a letter, "without either explaining or justifying [his actions]".

When he reached Hyderabad on 28 June 1708, he learned that Kam Bakhsh had attacked Machhlibandar to seize over three million rupees' worth of treasure hidden in its fort. The subahdar of the province, Jan Sipar Khan, refused to hand over the money. Enraged, Kam Bakhsh confiscated his properties and ordered the recruitment of four thousand soldiers for the attack. In July, the garrison at the Kulbarga fort declared their independence and garrison leader Daler Khan Bijapuri "reported his desertion from Kam Bakhsh". Historian William Irvine wrote that as his "camp drew nearer desertions from Kam Bakhsh became more and more frequent". On 1 November, Kam Bakhsh captured Pam Naik's (zamindar, the landlord of Wakinkhera) holdings after Naik abandoned his army.

According to Irvine, more soldiers deserted as the emperor's group neared. When Kam Bakhsh's general told him that his failure to pay his soldiers was the reason for their desertion, he replied: "What need have I of enlisting them? My trust is in God, and whatever is best will happen."

Thinking that Kam Bakhsh might flee to Persia, the emperor ordered his prime minister Zulfiqar Khan Nusrat Jung to agree with Madras Presidency governor Thomas Pitt to pay him 200,000 rupees for Kam Bakhsh's capture. On 20 December, Kam Bakhsh was reported to have a cavalry of 2,500 and an infantry of 5,000.

Death of Kam Bakhsh 
On 20 December 1708, the emperor marched towards Talab-i-Mir Jumla, on the outskirts of Hyderabad, with "three hundred camels, [and] twenty thousand rockets" for war with Kam Baksh. He made his son Jahandar Shah commander of the advance guard, later replacing him with Khan Zaman. On 12 January 1709, Bahadur Shah reached Hyderabad and prepared his troops. Although Kam Bakhsh had little money and few soldiers left, the royal astrologer had predicted that he would "miraculously" win the battle.

At sunrise the following day, the Mughal army charged towards Kam Bakhsh. His 15,000 troops were divided into two bodies: one led by Mumin Khan, assisted by Rafi-ush-Shan and Jahan Shah, and the second under Zulfiqar Khan Nusrat Jung. Two hours later Kam Bakhsh's camp was surrounded, and Zulfiqar Khan impatiently attacked him with his "small force".

With his soldiers outnumbered and unable to resist the attack, Kam Bakhsh joined the battle and shot two quivers of arrows at his opponents. According to Irvine, when he was "weakened by loss of blood", Bahadur Shah took him and his son Bariqullah prisoner. A dispute arose between Mumin Khan and Zulfikar Khan Nusrat Jung over who had captured them, with Rafi-us-Shan ruling in favour of the latter. Kam Bakhsh was brought by palanquin to the emperor's camp, where he died the next morning.

Sikh rebellion

Bahadur Shah, upon hearing of the uprising led by Banda Bahadur in Punjab only a year after Guru Gobind Singh's death, left the Deccan for the north. The Sikhs started moving cautiously towards Delhi and entered the sarkar of Hissar where they started preparation for a military campaign. They stormed Samana in November 1709 and defeated the faujdar in the Battle of Samana whilst sacking the town. Before taking Sirhind in the Battle of Chappar Chiri, Banda captured Shahabad, Sadhaura and Banur. Before Bahadur Shah's arrival in December, Banda had captured the sarkar of Sirhind, several parganas of the sarkar of Hissar, and had invaded the sarkar of Saharanpur.

After the victory at Sirhind, the Sikhs turned towards the Gangetic Doab. With trouble arising in a pargana of Deoband and Sikh converts complaining of imprisonment and persecution by the faujdar Jalal Khan, Banda marched on Saharanpur on the way to Jalalabad. The faujdar of Saharanpur, Ali Hamid Khan, fled to Delhi while the Sikhs defeated the defenders and reduced the town. They next attacked Behat whose Pirzadas were notorious for anti-Hindu acts, especially slaughtering cows. The town was sacked and the Pirzadas killed. They then marched to Jalalabad and Banda asked Jalal Khan to surrender and release the Sikh prisoners, but the Faujdar refused. They came to Nanauta on 21 July 1710 and defeated the local Sheikhzadas, who had put up a gallant defence but ultimately submitted to Banda's superior forces. The Sikhs then besieged Jalalabad but withdrew to Jalandhar Doab due to the flooding in the Krishna River.

The Sikhs tried to oust the Mughals from the regions of Jalandhar and Amritsar. They called on Shamas Khan, the Faujdar of Jalandhar, to effect reforms and hand over the treasury. Shamas pretended submission and later started attacking them. He appealed to Muslims in name of religion and declared a jihad against the Sikhs. The Sikhs, being outnumbered withdrew to Rahon and captured its fort after defeating the Mughals in the battle of Rahon on 12 October 1710. At Amritsar, about 8,000 Sikhs assembled and captured Majha and Riarki of central Punjab. They also attacked Lahore, where the mullahs declared a jihad against them with the governor not confronting the Sikhs. The ghazis were defeated by the Sikhs.

Sikhs used their newly established power to remove Mughal officials and replace them with Sikhs. Banda made his capital at Lohgarh, where he established a mint. He abolished the mughal Zamindari system and gave the cultivators proprietorship of their own land.

Efforts at suppression
Bahadur Shah signed peace treaties with Ajit Singh of Jodhpur, and Man Singh of Amber before fighting him. He also ordered the Nawab of Awadh Asaf-ud-Daula, provincial governor Khan-i-Durrani, Moradabad faujdar Muhammad Amin Khan Chin, Delhi subahdar Asad Khan and Jammu faujdar Wazid Khan to accompany him into battle. Shah left Ajmer for the Punjab on 17 June 1710, mobilising groups opposed to Bahadur on the way. When he learned about Shah's plans, Bahadur unsuccessfully appealed to Ajit Singh and Man Singh for help. In the meantime, Shah had reoccupied Sonipat, Kaithal and Panipat en route. In October, his commander Khanzada Nawab Feroz Khan wrote to him that he had "chopped three hundred heads of rebels"; Khan sent them to the emperor, who displayed them mounted on spears.

On 1 November 1710 the emperor reached the city of Karnal, where Mughal cartographer Rustam Dil Khan gave him a map of Thanesar and Sirhind. Six days later, a small group of Sikhs were defeated at Mewati and Banswal. The city of Sirhind fell to the Mughals on 7 December; its besieger, general Mohammad Amin Khan Bahadur, gave him a golden key ring commemorating the victory. After failing to recapture Sadaura he marched towards Lohgarh, where Bahadur was hiding. On 30 November he attacked the Lohgarh fort, capturing three guns, matchlocks and three trenches from the rebels. With little ammunition left, Bahadur and a "few hundred of his followers fled". His follower, Gulab Singh (who was "dressed like" Bahadur), entered the fight and was killed. The emperor issued orders to the rulers of Kumaon and Srinagar that if Bahadur tried to enter their province, he should be "sent to the Emperor".

Suspecting that Bahadur was allied with Bhup Prakash, the king of Nahan, the emperor had Prakash imprisoned in January 1711; his mother begged in vain for his release. After she sent him captured followers of Bahadur, he ordered that "ornaments worth 100,000 rupees should be manufactured" for her, and Prakash was released a month later. Shukan Khan Bahadur and Himmet Diler Khan were sent to Lahore to end Bahadur's rebellion, and their unsuccessful attempt was reinforced by a garrison of five thousand soldiers. Shah also pressed Rustam Dil Khan and Muhammad Amin Khan to join them.

Bahadur was hiding in Alhalab,  from Lahore. When Mughal workers came to repair a bridge in the village, his followers disinformed them that he was preparing to attack Delhi via Ajmer. Bahadur received soldiers from village ruler Ram Chand for his march against the Mughals, and besieged Fatehabad in April 1711. After learning from messenger Rustan Jung that he had crossed the Ravi River, the emperor attacked with artillery led by Isa Khan. In the July battle, Bahadur was defeated and fled to the Jammu hills. Forces led by Isa Khan Main and Muhammad Amin Khan followed but failed to capture him. The emperor issued an edict to the zamindars (landlord) of Jammu to take the Sikh captive if possible.

Bahadur was attacked by Muhammad Amin Khan at the river Satluj, escaping to the Garhwal hills. Finding him "invincible", the emperor went to Ajit Singh and Jai Singh for help. In October 1711, a joint Mughal-Rajput force marched towards Sadaura. Bahadur escaped the ensuing siege, this time taking refuge at Kulu in present-day Himachal Pradesh.

Khutba controversy 
After ascending the throne, Bahadur Shah converted to Shia Islam and altered the public prayer (or khutba) for the monarch said every Friday by giving the title wali to Ali, the fourth caliph and the first Shi'a Imam. Because of this, the citizens of Lahore resented reciting the khutba.

To solve the problem, Bahadur Shah went to Lahore in September 1711 and had discussions with Haji Yar Muhammad, Muhammad Murad and "other well-known men". At their meeting, he read "books of authority" to justify using the word wasi. He had a heated argument with Yar Muhammad, saying that martyrdom by a king was the only thing he wanted. Yar Muhammad (supported by the emperor's son, Azim-ush-Shan) recruited troops against Shah, but no war was fought. He held the khatib (chief reciter) at the Badshahi Mosque responsible for the matter, and had him arrested. On 2 October, although the army was deployed at the mosque the old khutba (which did not call Ali "wasi") was read.

Death

According to historian William Irvine, the emperor was in Lahore in January 1712 when his "health failed". On 24 February he made his final public appearance, and died during the night of 27–28 February; according to Mughal noble Kamwar Khan, he died of "enlargement of the spleen". On 11 April, his body was sent to Delhi under the supervision of his widow Mihr-Parwar and Chin Qilich Khan. He was buried on 15 May in the courtyard of the Moti Masjid (Pearl Mosque) in Mehrauli, which he built near the dargah of Qutbuddin Bakhtiar Kaki. He was succeeded by his son Jahandar Shah who ruled until 1713.

Coins
He issued gold, silver and copper coins, although his predecessors' coins were also used to pay government officials and in commerce. Copper coins from Aurangzeb's reign were re-minted with his name. Unlike the other Mughal emperors, his coins did not use his name in a couplet; poet Danishmand Khan composed two lines for the coins, but they were not approved.

Personal life

Name, title and lineage 
His full name, including his titles, was "Abul-nasr Sayyid Qutb-ud-din Muhammad Shah Alam Bahadur Shah Badshah". After his death, contemporary historians began calling him "Khuld-Manzil" (Departed to Paradise). He was the only Mughal emperor to have the title Sayyid, used by descendants of the Islamic prophet Muhammad. According to William Irvine, his maternal grandfather was Sayyid Shah Mir (whose daughter, Nawab Bai Ji, married Aurangzeb).

Children 

Source: Irvine, pp. 143–144

Depictions

Ancestry

Notes

References 

 
 
 
 
 
 
 
 
 
 
 
 
 
 
 
 
 
 

Mughal emperors
1643 births
1712 deaths
People from Agra
People from Burhanpur